Bannerman House is a historic plantation house located near Burgaw, Pender County, North Carolina. It was built about 1840, and is a large two-story, five bay, "L"-shaped, Greek Revival style frame dwelling.  It is sheathed in weatherboard and has a hipped roof pierced by three interior chimneys. The main facades each feature a one-bay pedimented portico, supported by colossal, flat-paneled pillars.

It was listed on the National Register of Historic Places in 1974.

References

Plantation houses in North Carolina
Houses on the National Register of Historic Places in North Carolina
Greek Revival houses in North Carolina
Houses completed in 1840
Houses in Pender County, North Carolina
National Register of Historic Places in Pender County, North Carolina